Lina Braknytė (19 October 1952, Vilnius) is a Lithuanian actress. She was voted the Best Actress in the republican film festival in 1967. She retired after several films and became Lina Paknenya.

Life 
She played several roles during the Soviet era, from 1964 to 1972. She is well known for playing lead role in 1964 movie The Girl and the Echo. The film is in Lithuanian and is known as The Last Day of Vacations in Lithuania. The movie, based on a story by Yuri Nagibin, depicts a young girl Vika enjoying the last days of summer vacations in a sea resort somewhere in the south. A scene where she is depicted swimming nude was criticized by teachers from Klaipėda who requested city officials to forbid its distribution. For her role in Dubravka, Braknytė was awarded the Best Actress in the republican film festival in 1967.

After high school, Braknytė moved to Moscow to study at the Gerasimov Institute of Cinematography, but she was not successful and returned to Vilnius. She did not act in any other films.

Filmography 
 1964 - The Girl and the Echo (Девочка и эхо / Paskutinė atostogų diena)
 1965 - Two in Love (Двое)
 1966 - Three Fat Men(Три толстяка)
 1967 - Dubravka (Дубравка)
 1971 - The Sea of Our Hope (Море нашей надежды)
 1972 - Last Fort (Последний форт)

References

External links 
 

1952 births
Living people
Actresses from Vilnius
Lithuanian child actresses
Lithuanian film actresses
Soviet child actresses
Soviet film actresses
20th-century Lithuanian actresses